Hans Effenberger (1902–1955) was an Austrian actor. Primarily a stage performer, he also appeared in several silent films. Later in his career he briefly worked as a screenwriter, and co-directed the 1949 film We've Just Got Married.

Selected filmography
 Oh, Dear Augustine (1922)
 The House of Molitor (1922)
 The City Without Jews (1924)
 The Monte Cristo of Prague (1929)
 We Make Music (1942, writer)
 We've Just Got Married (1949, director)

References

Bibliography
 Fritsche, Maria. Homemade Men in Postwar Austrian Cinema: Nationhood, Genre and Masculinity. Berghahn Books, 2013.

External links

1902 births
1955 deaths
Austrian male stage actors
Austrian male film actors
Austrian film directors
Male actors from Vienna